In the 1953 Virginia gubernatorial election, incumbent Governor John S. Battle, a Democrat, was unable to seek re-election due to term limits. Virginia State Senator Theodore Roosevelt Dalton was nominated by the Republican Party to run against former Democratic U.S. Representative Thomas B. Stanley. As of 2021, this is the last time that the city of Norfolk voted Republican for Governor of Virginia.

Candidates
Thomas B. Stanley, former U.S. Representative for Virginia's 5th congressional district (D), who defeated Charles R. Fenwick.
Theodore Roosevelt Dalton, Virginia State Senator (R)

Results

References

Gubernatorial
1953
Virginia
November 1953 events in the United States